Conus giorossii is a species of sea snail, a marine gastropod mollusk in the family Conidae, the cone snails, cone shells or cones.

These snails are predatory and venomous. They are capable of "stinging" humans.

Description
The size of the shell varies between 24 mm and 33 mm.

Distribution
This marine species of cone snail occurs off Flores, Indonesia.

References

 Bozzetti L. (2005) Conus giorossii sp. n. (Prosobranchia: Conidae) da Flores, Indonesia. Malacologia Mostra Mondiale 48: 3-5
 Filmer R.M. (2012) Taxonomic review of the Conus spectrum, Conus stramineus and Conus collisus complexes (Gastropoda - Conidae). Part III: The Conus collisus complex. Visaya 3(6): 4-47.
 Puillandre N., Duda T.F., Meyer C., Olivera B.M. & Bouchet P. (2015). One, four or 100 genera? A new classification of the cone snails. Journal of Molluscan Studies. 81: 1-23

External links
  To World Register of Marine Species
 Cone Shells - Knights of the Sea
 Phasmoconus giorossii
 Holotype in MNHN, Paris

giorossii
Gastropods described in 2005